Parapercis ommatura is a fish species in the sandperch family, Pinguipedidae. It is found from southern Japan to China. This species can reach a length of  TL.

References

Masuda, H., K. Amaoka, C. Araga, T. Uyeno and T. Yoshino, 1984. The fishes of the Japanese Archipelago. Vol. 1. Tokai University Press, Tokyo, Japan. 437 p.

Pinguipedidae
Taxa named by David Starr Jordan
Taxa named by John Otterbein Snyder
Fish described in 1902
Fish of Japan
Fish of China